Newtok is a small village on the Ningliq River in the Bethel Census Area, Alaska, United States. At the 2010 census, the population was 354, up from 321 in 2000. Climate change is forcing the primarily Central Yup'ik Alaska Native village to consider relocation. Mertarvik is the destination of those leaving the village.

Geography

Demographics

Newtok first appeared on the 1950 U.S. Census as "Keyaluvik", an unincorporated native village. This was also the name of the earlier settlement just to the west, which became known as "Old Keyaluvik." In 1960, the name was changed to Newtok. Newtok formally incorporated in 1976, but disincorporated in 1997. It was then made a census-designated place (CDP), effective with the 2000 census.

As of the census of 2000, there were 321 people, 63 households, and 51 families residing in the CDP. There were 67 housing units at an average density of 65.4/sq mi (25.1/km2). The racial makeup of the CDP was 3.12% White, 95.33% Native American, and 1.56% from two or more races.

There were 63 households, out of which 68.3% had children under the age of 18 living with them, 63.5% were married couples living together, 11.1% had a female householder with no husband present, and 19.0% were non-families. 19.0% of all households were made up of individuals, and none had someone living alone who was 65 years of age or older.  The average household size was 5.10 and the average family size was 5.96.

In the CDP, the population was spread out, with 45.2% under the age of 18, 10.0% from 18 to 24, 26.8% from 25 to 44, 14.3% from 45 to 64, and 3.7% who were 65 years of age or older.  The median age was 21 years. For every 100 females, there were 118.4 males.  For every 100 females age 18 and over, there were 112.0 males.

The median income for a household in the CDP was $32,188, and the median income for a family was $32,188. Males had a median income of $26,250 versus $15,625 for females. The per capita income for the CDP was $9,514.  About 29.8% of families and 31.0% of the population were below the poverty line, including 38.9% of those under age 18 and none of those age 65 or over.

Environmental issues

In 2007, The New York Times reported that erosion made Newtok an island between the widening Ningliq River and a slough to the north, because Alaskan permafrost is melting due to climate change. Coastal storms and thawing permafrost have worn away the land upon which Newtok was built. According to The New York Times article, because the village is below sea-level and sinking, the town could be washed away within a decade.

Erosion of the tundra by the river has destroyed much of the area of the village, including the barge dock. The United States Army Corps of Engineers' March 2009 report estimates the highest point in the town, the high school, will be under water by the year 2017.

The town was featured in the 2009 History Channel's TV show, Tougher in Alaska, in the episode called "Dangerous Earth."

In 2015, Newtok was one of the two towns featured in the Al Jazeera English Fault Lines documentary, When the Water Took the Land.

By 2019, the first residents moved to a new town, Mertarvik.

Education
Lower Kuskokwim School District operates the Ayaprun School, K-12.  the school has 128 students, 12 teachers, and 27 other employees. Its continuation is the Mertarvik Pioneer School.

Relocation

As of 2016, although the town's roughly 400 residents voted in 2003 to relocate to higher ground nine miles away, progress has been slow.

On December 24, 2016, the village made a disaster declaration request to the Federal Emergency Management Agency for disaster assistance due to "flooding, persistent erosion, and permafrost degradation starting in January 1, 2006 and continuing."  The request would "include relocation of the Yupik Tribe (population of ~350 people)."

During the summer of 2018, a 6,000 square-foot community center was built, as were 8 houses.  Plans for 2019 include interior work in the community center so it can be used as a school, a generator building, and 13 more houses.  Construction of roads, pipes, and a water treatment plant is planned.  The goal is to complete relocation by 2023.

In September 2022, Typhoon Merbok caused damage to fuel barrels and moved the ocean shoreline closer to the edge of the town.

See also
Effects of global warming
Sea level rise

References

Further reading 
 
 
 
 
 
Photo essay on warming in Newtok, Washington Post

External links

 Newtok Planning Group at Department of Commerce, Community, and Economic Development, State of Alaska

Census-designated places in Alaska
Census-designated places in Bethel Census Area, Alaska
Census-designated places in Unorganized Borough, Alaska
Former cities in Alaska